WMIA (1070 AM) is a radio station licensed to serve Arecibo, Puerto Rico. The station is owned by Wifredo G. Blanco Pi and it is part of the Borinquen Radio News Network. It airs a news/talk format and features programming from CNN Radio. The station is shared with translator station W227DY 93.3 FM also in Arecibo.

The station was assigned the WMIA call letters by the Federal Communications Commission.

Ownership
In 1957, WMIA begins operations on 1070 kHz, WMIA was owned and operated by Abacoa Radio Corporation until April 2017.

On March 2, 2017, Wifredo G. Blanco Pi reached an agreement to purchase WMIA from Abacoa Radio Corp. The sale was completed on April 12, 2017.

This becomes the fifth station of the WAPA Radio News Network.

The Borinquen Radio Network now consists of seven AM and seven FM radio stations across the island, WBQN 680 / W237FF 95.3 in San Juan, WMIA 1070 / W227DY 93.3 in Arecibo, WAPA 1260 / W268DJ 101.5 in Ponce, WTIL 1300 / W265EC 100.9 in Mayaguez, WXRF 1590 / W280FS 103.9 in Guayama, WVOZ 1580 / W286DL 105.1 in Aguadilla and WMTI 1160 / W287DR 105.3 in Barceloneta-Manati.

Translator stations

References

External links
FCC History Cards for WMIA

News and talk radio stations in Puerto Rico
Radio stations established in 1957
1957 establishments in Puerto Rico
MIA (AM)